Gert Cornelius Nel (6 April 1885 – 16 February 1950) was a South African botanist. His formal botanical author abbreviation is Nel.

The genus Nelia, a flowering plant of the family Aizoaceae, is named in his honor.

Biography
Nel was born in 1885 in Greytown, Natal Colony on a farm. He earned a BA at the University of Stellenbosch then earned a doctorate in botany at the University of Berlin under both Adolf Engler and Gottlieb Haberlandt. Nel emphasized African plant species in his studies, especially in the families Amaryllidaceae and Hypoxidaceae. He provided numerous first descriptions of species of the genera Forbesia, Ianthe, Hypoxis, and Rhodohypoxis.

In 1921, Nel became a professor of botany at the University of Stellenbosch, a position he would hold until his death.

Nel published the first book on the plant genus Lithops in the family Aizoaceae in 1946, entitled Lithops.  Lithops are native to southern Africa and known for their stone-like appearance.

Nel died in Stellenbosch in 1950.

Legacy
The genus Nelia, discovered in 1928 by Gustav Schwantes, is named after Nel. Other succulent plant species are also named after Nel, including:
Braunsia nelii
Conophytum nelianum
Euphorbia nelii
Gasteria neliana
Gibbaeum nelii
Glottiphyllum nelii
Hereroa nelii
Herrea nelii
Stapelia neliana

References

1885 births
1950 deaths
20th-century South African botanists
Botanists active in Africa
Academic staff of Stellenbosch University
Stellenbosch University alumni
Humboldt University of Berlin alumni